The Frontier is a pro-democracy political group in the Hong Kong. It was established on 9 September 2010. The group is headed by convenor Yan Sun-kong since its establishment as a loose group of individual pro-democracy activists and was part of the People Power from 2011 to 2016. A party bearing the same name existed between 1996 and 2008.

On 23 November 2008, The Frontier declared that it would merge with the Democratic Party, also in the pro-democracy camp, but the motion to have it disbanded failed to meet the required support level of 80%. The party was reestablished on 9 September 2010 by former members who opposed joining the Democratic Party. Yang Sun-kong has been convenor since the reestablishment. From 2011 to 2016, the party was part of the People Power. The group held one seat in the Legislative Council of Hong Kong, Raymond Chan Chi-chuen who also represents for People Power.

The Frontier left the People Power in April 2016. It lost its only seat in the Legislative Council after legislator Raymond Chan left the party in May 2016.

Performance in elections

Legislative Council elections

District Council elections

References

External links
Official website of The Frontier

Political parties established in 2010
Political parties in Hong Kong
2010 establishments in Hong Kong
People Power (Hong Kong)
Liberal parties in Hong Kong